2,3-Dihydroxy-3-methylpentanoic acid is an intermediate in the metabolism of isoleucine.

Alpha hydroxy acids
Vicinal diols
Beta hydroxy acids